Jorge Rossi Chavarría  (January 25, 1922 – January 3, 2006) was a Costa Rican politician. He was a lawyer, businessman. He co-founded the National Liberation Party (PLN) with Jose Figueres. He was Vice President of Costa Rica from 1970 to 1974 and representative from 1986 to 1990.

Rossi was the son of José Monge and Chavarría Amalia Flores. At age 15, was national champion chess second category (1937). He earned a degree in law at the University of Costa Rica and joined the Bar Association on June 12, 1945.  He served as president of the Graduate Student Council. During the Revolution of 1948, and his brothers Alvaro Hernán joined the revolutionary army known Caribbean Legion.

He was a professor at the Faculty of Economics and Social Sciences at the University of Costa Rica.  During the years 1947 and 1948, he served as legal advisor to the Costa Rican Confederation of Workers of Rerum novarum. He co-founded the National Liberation Party (PLN) in 1951.

He served as Minister of Economy and Finance during the second term of Figueres Ferrer (1953 to 1956). He was the president of the Central Bank of Costa Rica from November 1970 to May 1971.

As an entrepreneur, founded the company customs Corman, one of the most important of the country and was one of the main drivers of banana production.

In 2002, he published " La traición de los leales " - under the auspices of the UNED - an autobiography where he recounted his life throughout the twentieth century.

In his private life was supernumerary of the Personal prelature of Opus Dei. He was involved in social work, promoting projects to provide land and housing for farmers and workers.  The exact scope of its social work is unknown, since he always tried to remain anonymous. As the newspaper Nacion stated the day after his death, he will be remembered as "the patriot" in business and government circles and among his friends, "because of his great contribution to the nation's development."

He had three children from his first marriage to Virginia Umaña Volio.

Jorge Rossi Chavarria died of a heart attack at the age of 84.

References

External links 
 Ospina de Fonseca, Helena, "Jorge Rossi Chavarría".
 Rojas, José Enrique, Jorge Rossi Chavarría: Falleció "un patriota".
 Jorge Rossi Chavarría: Falleció "un patriota"
 Muere Jorge Rossi Chavarría
 http://www.elespiritudel48.org/bio/bio32.htm
 https://web.archive.org/web/20081223121250/http://www.gilchaverri.info/tiempos.html
 ¡Viva Rossi!
 Manifiesto a Los Solialdemócratas Costarricenses
 Tribuna democrática

Vice presidents of Costa Rica
1922 births
2006 deaths
Opus Dei members
National Liberation Party (Costa Rica) politicians
Finance ministers of Costa Rica
Members of the Legislative Assembly of Costa Rica
University of Costa Rica alumni
Academic staff of the University of Costa Rica
Costa Rican bankers